Arjun is an Indian male given name, which means lustrous, shiny white (as that of silver), color of the lightning; of the milk; of  silver; made  of  silver. It is also the name of the Arjun tree due to its silvery bark; Name of lndra, and of the third of the Pandava prince (who was a son of Indra and Kunti)

Notable persons with the name

Legendary 
Arjuna, a character of the Mahabharata
Kartavirya Arjuna, a character of the Mahabharata and Ramayana
Guru Arjun, the 5th Sikh Guru of the Sikh faith

Rulers 
 Arjuna Varman I, Paramara king of central India
 Arjuna Varman II, Paramara king of central India
 Arjuna, a Paratarajas ruler of Baluchistan area (c. 150–160 CE)

Actors 
Arjun (Firoz Khan), Indian actor, born as Firoz Khan, who played the role of Arjuna in B. R. Chopra's TV series Mahabharat
Arjun Bijlani, Indian television actor and model
Arjun Kapoor, Indian movie actor
 Arjun Punj, Indian television actor
Arjun Rampal, Indian fashion model and movie actor
Arjun Sarja, Indian movie actor
Allu Arjun, Indian actor of Telugu films
Sara Arjun, Indian child actress

Sports 

 Arjun Atwal, professional golfer
 Arjun Erigaisi, Indian chess grandmaster
 Arjun Nair, Australian cricketer
 Arjun Naidu, former Indian First Class cricketer
 Arjuna Ranatunga, former Sri Lankan cricketer, now a politician
 Arjun Yadav, former Indian First Class cricketer

Others 
Arjun (singer) (Arjun Coomaraswamy), British-Sri Lankan singer-songwriter and producer
Arjun Appadurai, Indian-American social theorist
Arjun Janya, Indian film score and soundtrack composer and singer
Arjun Munda, chief minister of the Indian state of Jharkhand
Arjun Kanungo, Indian singer

See also 
 Arjun (disambiguation)
 Arjun Gupta (disambiguation)

References

Indian masculine given names